February 1 - Eastern Orthodox liturgical calendar - February 3

All fixed commemorations below are observed on February 15 by Eastern Orthodox Churches on the Old Calendar.

For February 2nd, Orthodox Churches on the Old Calendar commemorate the Saints listed on January 20.

Feasts

 The Presentation of our Lord, God and Savior Jesus Christ in the Temple (also The Meeting of the Lord, or Hypapante), 40 days after His sacred birth.

Saints

 Martyr Agathadorus of Tyana in Cappadocia.

Pre-Schism Western saints

 Saint Apronian, a Roman executioner who converted to Orthodoxy when taking the martyr St Sisinnius before the tribunal and was then himself martyred (c. 304)
 Saint Flosculus (Flou), Bishop of Orleans in France (c. 480)
 Saint Laurence of Canterbury, the second Archbishop of Canterbury (619)  (see also: February 3 - East)
 Saint Adalbert I of Ostrevent (Adalbald), founder of Marchiennes Abbey (652)
 Saint Feock, a saint recalled by a church dedication in Cornwall. 
 Saint Adeloga (Hadeloga), a daughter of Charles Martel, first Abbess of Kitzingen in Germany (c. 745)
 Martyrs of Ebsdorf, martyred at the Battle of Luneberg Heath near Ebsdorf, Saxony (880)
 Saint Marquard, Bishop of Hildesheim, martyred with others at Ebsdorf in Germany (880)
 Saint Theodoric, third Bishop of Minden, martyred with others at Ebsdorf in Germany  (880)
 Saint Columbanus, born in Ireland, he lived as a hermit near the church of Saint-Bavo in Ghent in Belgium (959)

Post-Schism Orthodox saints

 New Martyr Jordan of Trebizond, at Constantinople (1650)
 New Hieromartyr Gabriel, Hierodeacon, of Constantinople (1676)
 Venerable Anthimos (Vagianos) of Chios (1960)  (see also: February 15 - Greek)
 Venerable Ekvtime (Kereselidze) the Confessor, of Georgia (1944)  (see also: January 20 - Slavonic)

Other commemorations

 Repose of Schema-monk Seraphim of Valaam Monastery (1860)

Icons

 Synaxis of the Icon of the Theotokos the Hypapante of Kalamata, patron saint of Kalamata.
 Synaxis of the Icon of the Theotokos "Apekois" (Ypakoe), at the Church of the Hypapante on Kalymnos.
 Synaxis of the Icon of the Theotokos "Dreadful Bee", at Leivadi on Kythira.
 Synaxis of the Icon of the Theotokos of Goumenissa.  (see also: August 17)
 Synaxis of the Icon of the Theotokos "'Flevariotissa' or 'Libya'", at Mesaria on the island of Astypalaia.
 Synaxis of the Icon of the Theotokos "Flevariotissa", at Ampelakia on Salamis Island.
 Synaxis of the Icon of the Theotokos "Chrysaliniotissa", in Leukosia, Cyprus.

Icon gallery

Notes

References

Sources
 February 2 / 15. Orthodox Calendar (Pravoslavie.ru).
 February 15 / 2. Holy Trinity Russian Orthodox Church (A parish of the Patriarchate of Moscow).
 February 2. OCA - The Lives of the Saints.
 The Autonomous Orthodox Metropolia of Western Europe and the Americas. St. Hilarion Calendar of Saints for the year of our Lord 2004. St. Hilarion Press (Austin, TX). p. 12.
 The Second Day of the Month of February. Orthodoxy in China.
 February 2. Latin Saints of the Orthodox Patriarchate of Rome.
 The Roman Martyrology. Transl. by the Archbishop of Baltimore. Last Edition, According to the Copy Printed at Rome in 1914. Revised Edition, with the Imprimatur of His Eminence Cardinal Gibbons. Baltimore: John Murphy Company, 1916. pp. 35–36.
 Rev. Richard Stanton. A Menology of England and Wales, or, Brief Memorials of the Ancient British and English Saints Arranged According to the Calendar, Together with the Martyrs of the 16th and 17th Centuries. London: Burns & Oates, 1892. pp. 46-48.
Greek Sources
 Great Synaxaristes:  2 Φεβρουαρίου. Μεγασ Συναξαριστησ.
  Συναξαριστής. 2 Φεβρουαρίου. Ecclesia.gr. (H Εκκλησια Τησ Ελλαδοσ).
Russian Sources
  15 февраля (2 февраля). Православная Энциклопедия под редакцией Патриарха Московского и всея Руси Кирилла (электронная версия). (Orthodox Encyclopedia - Pravenc.ru).
  2 февраля по старому стилю / 15 февраля по новому стилю. Русская Православная Церковь - Православный церковный календарь на 2018 год.

February in the Eastern Orthodox calendar